The 2015–16 First League of the Republika Srpska was the twenty-first season of the First League of the Republika Srpska, the second tier football league of Bosnia and Herzegovina, since its original establishment and the fourteenth as a second-tier league.

Clubs 

 FK Borac Šamac
 FK Drina HE Višegrad
 FK Kozara Gradiška
 FK Krupa
 FK Leotar
 FK Mladost Velika Obarska
 FK Sloboda Mrkonjić Grad
 FK Sloboda Novi Grad
 FK Sutjeska Foča
 FK Tekstilac Derventa
 FK Vlasenica
 FK Zvijezda 09 Etno Selo Stanišići

Regular season

Promotion round

Relegation round

See also
2015–16 Premier League of Bosnia and Herzegovina
2015–16 First League of the Federation of Bosnia and Herzegovina
2015–16 Bosnia and Herzegovina Football Cup

References

External links
League statistics at SportSport.ba
Official site for the Football Federation of Bosnia and Herzegovina
Official site for the Football Federation of the Republika of Srpska

 

Bos
2
First League of the Republika Srpska seasons